The 1999 Villanova Wildcats football team represented the Villanova University during the 1999 NCAA Division I-AA football season. The Wildcats were led by 15th-year head coach Andy Talley played their home games at Villanova Stadium in Villanova, Pennsylvania

Schedule

Roster

Team players in the NFL
No Villanova players were selected in the 2000 NFL Draft.

References

Villanova
Villanova Wildcats football seasons
Villanova Wildcats football